LoveHateHero was a rock band formed in Burbank, California in 2004 by vocalist Pierrick Berube, guitarists Josh Newman and Mark Johnston, bassist Paris Bosserman, and drummer Bryan Ross. They were signed to Ferret Music and released three albums, Just Breathe in May 2005, White Lies in February 2007, and America Underwater in November 2009.

About
They have toured with bands such as Chiodos, Eighteen Visions, Funeral for a Friend, He Is Legend, and It Dies Today. They appeared on the Black on Black Tour with Escape the Fate, Blessthefall, Before Their Eyes, and Dance Gavin Dance.

During October and November 2007, LoveHateHero co-headlined a tour with So They Say that featured support from National Product, Tokyo Rose, and Before Their Eyes. 

In 2008, they went on the One Moment Management Tour with Before Their Eyes, I See Stars, Oceana, Eyes Set to Kill and Ice Nine Kills
as well as their TerminaTOUR with Blessed by a Broken Heart, Agraceful, Karate Highschool, and Kiros.

In 2009 they were on the Dead or Alive Tour with I Am Ghost and Karate Highschool, the Revolver Tour with Eyes Set To Kill and Dreaming of Eden, the Napalm and Noise Tour with The Devil Wears Prada, All That Remains, and Story of the Year as well as a monthlong Brazil Tour with Mr. Clown.

They played on the Vans Warped Tour 2009 at the Seattle, Portland, Fresno, San Francisco, Sacramento, and San Diego venues.

In 2010 they headlined the America Underwater Tour with Four Letter Lie, Sleeping With Sirens, Of Machines, and Destruction of a Rose, did their first European Tour with Blessed by a Broken Heart and are currently on the Wet Hot American Summer Tour with Young and Divine and The Venetia Fair.
The band shot a music video for their first single off America Underwater for the song America Underwater.

In June 2010, the song "America Underwater" became available for purchase on the Rock Band Network for PS3, Xbox 360, and Wii.

Other projects

 Kevin "Thrasher" Gruft played Rockstar's Uproar Music Festival with Escape the Fate and was the lead guitarist in Craig Mabbitt's side project, The Dead Rabbitts, until late summer of 2012. He played and recorded all the guitars on the Deuce album, Nine Lives. In the mid-2012 he Tweeted giving hints about an upcoming solo Album. He is currently a producer, engineer and songwriter working with various artists and producers across many genres. He has played in LoveHateHero, The Dead Rabbitts, Escape the Fate, Matt Toka, and Blessed by a Broken Heart. He is currently the lead guitarist for Escape the Fate.
 Justin Whitesel briefly joined the band The Hollowed but left for unexplained reasons. He became a touring guitarist for many artists including Eyes Set To Kill on their summer tour with Falling in Reverse and For All Those Sleeping. Whitesel has since started the group XO Stereo (which features members of From First To Last) and signed a worldwide record deal with Century Media Records. He also accompanied Telle Smith as his guitarist on an acoustic emo-nite tour. He now works as an Art Director in Videogame Advertising (notably Call of Duty and Microsoft Xbox)
 Bryan Ross is currently a producer and engineer, working with former LHH and Escape the Fate member Omar Espinosa. He was drafted by ETF producer Michael "Elvis" Baskette to co-write and record Falling in Reverse's debut album The Drug in Me Is You, performing both the drums and rhythm guitars on the record. He also worked with Elvis on FACT's 2012 album, burundanga. In January 2012, he rejoined Perfect Like Me but left in late April.
 Omar Espinosa is currently a producer. In 2004 he left LHH to join Escape the Fate later leaving for personal reasons. He joined Perfect Like Me leaving in 2009 to concentrate on his family. He contributed writing on Falling in Reverse's studio album, The Drug in Me Is You, and in January 2012 rejoined Perfect Like Me but left in late April.
 Mark Johnston had a brief stint with Divide the Day.
 Myke Russell is currently a member of the band 2hots.
 Scott Gee had joined Falling in Reverse in 2010 to participate in their studio album but was removed for unexplained reasons.

Members

Final line-up
Pierrick Berube - lead vocals, additional guitars and keyboards (2003-2011)
Arthur "Paris" Bosserman - bass, piano, backing vocals (2003-2011)
Justin Whitesel - rhythm guitar, keyboards, synthesizers, piano, programming, arrangements, backing vocals (2008-2011)
Scotty Gee - drums, percussion, piano (2005-2011)
Kevin "Thrasher" Gruft - lead guitar, backing vocals (2006-2011)

Former members
Omar Espinosa - lead guitar, backing vocals (2003-2004)
Mark Johnston - lead guitar, backing vocals (2004-2005)
Myke Russell - lead guitar, vocals (2005-2006), rhythm guitar, vocals (2006-2008)
Josh Newman - rhythm guitar, backing vocals (2003-2005)
Bryan Ross - drums, additional guitar, backing vocals (2004-2005)

Timeline

Discography
 Just Breathe (2005)
 White Lies (2007)
 America Underwater (2009)

Videography
 The Risk (2005)
 Red Dress (2007)
 America Underwater (2009)

References

Other sources

External links
Official Myspace page

Musical groups from Los Angeles
American post-hardcore musical groups
Rock music groups from California
Musical groups established in 2005
Ferret Music artists